Yermakova Gar is a rural locality (a village) in Kichmengskoye Rural Settlement, Kichmengsko-Gorodetsky District, Vologda Oblast, Russia. The population was 30 as of 2002.

Geography 
Yermakova Gar is located 10 km northeast of Kichmengsky Gorodok (the district's administrative centre) by road. Nabolotnaya Gar is the nearest rural locality.

References 

Rural localities in Kichmengsko-Gorodetsky District